Wachtmeister is a German, Austrian and Swiss military rank of non-commissioned officers.

Wachtmeister may also refer to:

Wachtmeister (surname)
, several ships of the Swedish Navy